The Lorraine 40t was a prototype French medium tank of the Cold War.

Development  
After the end of the Second World War, the French Army was in pressing need of a modern tank with heavy armament. In March 1945, French industry was invited to design a tank, which resulted in the AMX-50.

However, it was already obvious in the early 1950s that the AMX-50 tank might turn out to be too heavy due to attempts to improve the gun and armor in response to Soviet tanks such as the IS-3. Thus, in 1950, a 40 tonne medium tank project was started. The Lorraine company built a medium tank prototype based on their earlier Canon D’Assaut Lorraine project.

Description 
The total weight was limited to 39.7 tonnes. The Lorraine 40t featured a pike nose design similar to the IS-3. It had an oscillating turret like the AMX-50. The Lorraine 40t mounted a 100 mm SA47 gun fed from a drum autoloader similar to that of the AMX-50 project.

The vehicle inherited the Veil Picard pneumatic tires from the Canon D’Assaut Lorraine which helped to reduce weight.

The Lorraine 40t had a SCR 508 radio for external communications.

The two prototypes were apparently scrapped after the discontinuation of the project.

References 

Medium tanks of the Cold War
Medium tanks of France
Abandoned military projects of France
Tanks with autoloaders